Pope Honorius I (died 12 October 638) was the bishop of Rome from 27 October 625 to his death. He was active in spreading Christianity among Anglo-Saxons and attempted to convince the Celts to calculate Easter in the Roman fashion. He is chiefly remembered for his correspondence with Patriarch Sergius I of Constantinople over the latter's monothelite teachings. Honorius was posthumously anathematized, initially for subscribing to monothelitism, and later only for failing to end it. The anathema against Honorius I became one of the central arguments against the doctrine of papal infallibility.

Early life 
Honorius was a rich aristocrat who came from Campania. His father was the consul Petronius. Nothing is known about Honorius I's career before he became pope on 27 October 625. He was consecrated only two days after the death of his predecessor, Boniface V. The vacancy was short probably because of the presence in Rome of Isaac the Armenian, who was empowered to confirm the election as the imperial exarch in Italy.

Papacy 
As pope, Honorius I looked up to Gregory I and employed monks rather than secular clergy as staff at the Lateran Palace. He initially supported Adaloald, the deposed Catholic king of the Lombards, but established cordial relations with Adoald's Arian rival Arioald. He did not succeed in resolving the schism of Venetia-Istria, but took steps to appease the archbishops of Ravenna, who were dissatisfied with their subordination to Rome. Honorius actively supported the difficult Christianisation of Anglo-Saxon England and sent Birinus to convert the West Saxons, but less successful in convincing the Celts to abandon their system of computing the date of Easter. At the Sixth Council of Toledo, Honorius urged the Visigothic bishops to continue baptizing Jews, a policy instituted by Gregory I.

Honorius became involved in early discussions regarding the doctrine of Monothelitism, which is the teaching that Christ has only one energy and one will, in contrast with the teaching that he has two energies and two wills, both human and divine. Patriarch Sergius I of Constantinople wrote an initial letter informing Honorius of the Monoenergism controversy, asking Honorius to endorse a position that Church unity should not be endangered by having any discussions or disputes over Christ’s possessing one energy or two.  Sergius added that the doctrine of two energies could lead to the erroneous belief that Jesus has two conflicting wills. Pope Honorius’ reply in 635 endorsed this view that all discussions over energies should cease, and agreed that Jesus does not have two conflicting wills, but one will, since Jesus did not assume the vitiated human nature tainted by Adam's fall, but human nature as it existed prior to Adam's fall.

Honorius was apparently aware of the rise of Islam and viewed this religion's tenets as closely resembling those of Arius.

Legacy 

In the Third Council of Constantinople, the monothelites were anathematized by name "and with them Honorius, who was Prelate of Rome, as having followed them in all things" in the XIII session. Citing his written correspondence with Sergius, Honorius was subsequently accused of having confirmed his impious doctrines; the XVI session reaffirmed the condemnation of the heretics explicitly stating "to Honorius, the heretic, anathema!", and concluding with the decree of the XVII session that 
Honorius had not stopped provoking scandal and error in the Body of the Church; for he had "with unheard of expressions disseminated amidst the faithful people the heresy of the one will", doing so "in agreement with the insane false doctrine of the impious Apollinaire, Severus and Themistius". The Roman legates made no objection to his condemnation.

Pope Leo II's letter of confirmation of the Council commended it for it had "perfectly preached the definition of the true faith" and made reference to the condemnation of his predecessor:

Within the year a Latin translation of the Acts of the council had been disseminated and signed by the Bishops throughout the West. The condemnation of Pope Honorius was reiterated by Pope Leo's successors, subsequent councils and included in Breviary lessons up until the eighteenth century. As a result, Honorius would later be the subject of vigorous attacks by opponents of papal infallibility in the discussions surrounding the First Vatican Council of 1870. In contemporary times, that Honorius actually agreed with Sergius on the doctrine of monothelitism has given rise to much discussion, and John B. Bury argues that the most reasonable conclusion is that Honorius did not really apprehend the point at issue, considering it more a question of grammar than theology, for he placed "one energy" and "two energies" on exactly the same footing; in Bury's words, "it was for the 'imprudent economy of silence' that he was condemned".

References

Bibliography 
Bury, John B., A history of the later Roman empire from Arcadius to Irene, Volume 2 (2005)
 
Hefele, Charles J., A History of the Councils of the Church, From the Original Documents, Volume 5 (1896)

External links 

Guilty Only of Failure To Teach
History of the Christian Church, Volume IV: Mediaeval Christianity. A.D. 590–1073, Philip Schaff

638 deaths
Popes of the Byzantine Papacy
7th-century popes
Italian popes
People declared heretics by the first seven ecumenical councils
Popes
Year of birth unknown
7th-century Italian writers
7th-century Latin writers
Burials at St. Peter's Basilica